Book of Exit: Dub Chamber 4 is the fourth album by American composer Bill Laswell issued under the moniker Sacred System. It was released on October 29, 2002 by ROIR.

Track listing

Personnel 
Adapted from the Book of Exit: Dub Chamber 4 liner notes.
Musicians
Aïyb Dieng – percussion
Karsh Kale – drums, tabla
Bill Laswell – bass guitar, guitar, keyboards, musical arrangements, producer 
Ejigayehu "Gigi" Shibabaw – vocals
Technical personnel
John Brown – cover art
James Dellatacoma – assistant engineer
Robert Musso – engineering, programming

Release history

References

External links 
 Book of Exit: Dub Chamber 4 at Bandcamp
 

2002 albums
Bill Laswell albums
Albums produced by Bill Laswell
ROIR albums